Excelsior High School may refer to:

 Excelsior High School (Norwalk, California)
 Excelsior High School (Jamaica), Kingston, Jamaica
 Excelsior School in the Lincolnville section of St. Augustine, Florida